The 2019–20 USC Upstate Spartans men's basketball team represented the University of South Carolina Upstate in the 2019–20 NCAA Division I men's basketball season. The Spartans, led by second-year head coach Dave Dickerson, played their home games at the G. B. Hodge Center in Spartanburg, South Carolina, as members of the Big South Conference. They finished the season 13–20, 7–11 in Big South play to finish in a three-way tie for seventh place. They defeated High Point in the first round of the Big South tournament before losing the quarterfinals to Winthrop.

Previous season
The Spartans finished the 2018–19 season 6–26 overall, 1–15 in Big South play to finish in eleventh place. In the Big South tournament, they were defeated by Charleston Southern in the first round.

Roster

Schedule and results

|-
!colspan=12 style=| Non-conference regular season

|-
!colspan=9 style=| Big South Conference regular season

|-
!colspan=12 style=| Big South tournament
|-

|-

Source

References

USC Upstate Spartans men's basketball seasons
USC Upstate Spartans
USC Upstate Spartans men's basketball
USC Upstate Spartans men's basketball